This is a categorised list of places in the administrative county of Pembrokeshire.

Administrative divisions

County electoral wards

This is a list of electoral wards to Pembrokeshire County Council:

Amroth and Saundersfoot North
Boncath and Clydau
Bro Gwaun
Burton
Camrose
Carew and Jeffreyston
Cilgerran and Eglwyswrw
Crymych and Maenachlog-ddu
East Williamston
Fishguard North East
Fishguard North West
Goodwick
Haverfordwest Castle
Haverfordwest Garth
Haverfordwest Portfield
Haverfordwest Prendergast
Haverfordwest Priory
Hundleton
Johnston
Kilgetty and Begelly
Lampeter Velfrey
Lamphey
Letterston
Llangwm
Llanrhian
Maenclochog
Manorbier and Penally
Martletwy
Merlin's Bridge
Milford Central (Milford Haven)
Milford East
Milford Hakin
Milford Hubberston
Milford North
Milford West
Narberth
Narberth Rural
Newport and Dinas
Neyland East
Neyland West
Pembroke Monkton and St Mary South
Pembroke St Mary North
Pembroke St Michael
Pembroke Dock Bufferland
Pembroke Dock Bush
Pembroke Dock Central
Pembroke Dock Market
Pembroke Dock Pennar
Rudbaxton
Saundersfoot South
Solva
St David's
St. Dogmaels
St Florence and St Mary Out Liberty
St. Ishmael's
Tenby North
Tenby South
The Havens
Wiston

Communities
This is a list of communities

 Ambleston
 Amroth
 Angle
 Boncath
 Brawdy
 Burton
 Camrose
 Carew
 Cilgerran
 Clydau
 Clynderwen
 Cosheston
 Crymych
 Cwm Gwaun
 Dale
 Dinas Cross
 East Williamston
 Eglwyswrw
 Fishguard
 Freystrop
 Goodwick
 Haverfordwest
 Hayscastle
 Herbrandston
 Hook
 Hundleton
 Jeffreyston
 Johnston
 Kilgetty/Begelly
 Lampeter Velfrey
 Lamphey
 Letterston
 Llanddewi Velfrey
 Llandissilio West
 Llangwm
 Llanrhian
 Llanstadwell
 Llanteg
 Llawhaden
 Maenclochog
 Manorbier
 Manordeifi
 Marloes and St. Brides
 Martletwy
 Mathry
 Merlin's Bridge
 Milford Haven
 Mynachlog-ddu
 Narberth
 Nevern
 New Moat
 Newport
 Neyland
 Nolton and Roch
 Pembroke
 Pembroke Dock
 Penally
 Pencaer
 Puncheston
 Rosemarket
 Rudbaxton
 Saundersfoot
 Scleddau
 Solva
 Spittal
 St David's and the Cathedral Close
 St. Dogmaels
 St. Florence
 St. Ishmael's
 St. Mary Out Liberty
 Stackpole and Castlemartin
 Templeton
 Tenby
 The Havens
 Tiers Cross
 Trecwn
 Uzmaston, Boulston and Slebech
 Walwyn's Castle
 Wiston
 Wolfscastle

Principal towns

Haverfordwest
Milford Haven
Narberth
Newport
Neyland
Pembroke
Pembroke Dock
St David's (city status)
Tenby
Fishguard

Visitor attractions
Blue Lagoon waterpark
Bluestone holiday village
Manor House Wildlife Park
Oakwood Theme Park
Pembrokeshire Motor Museum

Geographical

Islands

Caldey Island
Grassholm Island
Ramsey Island
Skokholm Island
Skomer Island

Rivers and waterways

Carew River
Cresswell River
Daugleddau
River Gwaun
River Nevern
River Syfynwy
River Teifi

 Broad Haven
 Broad Haven South (near Bosherston)
 Little Haven (to the south of Broad Haven)
 Freshwater East
 Freshwater West

Parkland
Pembrokeshire Coast National Park

Hills and mountains
Preseli Hills

Historical and archaeological places
St David's Cathedral
St Davids Head

Castles

Carew Castle
Cilgerran Castle
Cresswell Castle
Haverfordwest Castle
Llawhaden Castle
Manorbier Castle
Pembroke Castle
Picton Castle
Roch Castle
Tenby Castle
Wiston Castle

Transport

Airports
Haverfordwest Aerodrome
Pembrey Airport

Footpaths and cycleways
Celtic Trail cycle route (part of NCR 4)

Roads
A477 road
A478 road
A487 road
A4076 road
B4329 road

Railway lines
West Wales Line

Railway stations

Clarbeston Road railway station
Clunderwen railway station
Fishguard Harbour railway station
Haverfordwest railway station
Johnston railway station
Kilgetty railway station
Lamphey railway station
Manorbier railway station
Milford Haven railway station
Narberth railway station
Pembroke Dock railway station
Pembroke railway station
Penally railway station
Saundersfoot railway station
Tenby railway station

Shipping
Fishguard
Milford Haven (harbour)
Pembroke Dock

Lighthouses
Caldey Lighthouse
Skokholm Lighthouse
Smalls Lighthouse
South Bishop Lighthouse
St. Ann's Head Lighthouse
Strumble Head Lighthouse

See also
List of places in Pembrokeshire for an alphabetical list of cities, towns and villages.
Pembrokeshire

Pembrokeshire